Rome is a borough in Bradford County, Pennsylvania, United States. It is part of Northeastern Pennsylvania. The population was 385 at the 2020 census.

History
The Phillip Paul Bliss House was added to the National Register of Historic Places in 1986.

Geography
Rome is located in northeastern Bradford County at  (41.856855, -76.341558), in the valley of Wysox Creek, a tributary of the Susquehanna River. It is surrounded by Rome Township but is separate from it.

Pennsylvania Route 187 passes through the borough, leading southwest  to Towanda, the county seat, and north  to the New York state line.

Demographics

As of the census of 2000, there were 382 people, 157 households, and 103 families residing in the borough. The population density was 617.3 people per square mile (237.9/km²). There were 176 housing units at an average density of 284.4 per square mile (109.6/km²). The racial makeup of the borough was 98.95% White, 0.52% Native American, 0.26% Asian, and 0.26% from two or more races.

There were 157 households, out of which 31.8% had children under the age of 18 living with them, 50.3% were married couples living together, 11.5% had a female householder with no husband present, and 33.8% were non-families. 28.7% of all households were made up of individuals, and 11.5% had someone living alone who was 65 years of age or older. The average household size was 2.43 and the average family size was 2.99.

In the borough the population was spread out, with 28.0% under the age of 18, 8.6% from 18 to 24, 29.6% from 25 to 44, 20.4% from 45 to 64, and 13.4% who were 65 years of age or older. The median age was 33 years. For every 100 females there were 86.3 males. For every 100 females age 18 and over, there were 82.1 males.

The median income for a household in the borough was $26,417, and the median income for a family was $29,875. Males had a median income of $27,222 versus $16,458 for females. The per capita income for the borough was $15,127. About 15.2% of families and 20.6% of the population were below the poverty line, including 28.6% of those under age 18 and none of those age 65 or over.

Notable person
 Philip Bliss, writer of "Hallelujah, What a Saviour!" and other hymns

References

Populated places established in 1796
Boroughs in Bradford County, Pennsylvania
1860 establishments in Pennsylvania